Sabine Berger (born 21 January 1966) is a German former footballer who played as a forward, appearing for the East Germany women's national team in their first and only match on 9 May 1990.

Career statistics

International

References

External links
 

1966 births
Living people
German women's footballers
East German women's footballers
East Germany women's international footballers
Women's association football forwards
1. FFC Turbine Potsdam players